Karmen McNamara (born October 12, 1983) is a Canadian triathlete and CEO of The Kindness Factory.

McNamara won the 2019 Canadian National Championships in Kelowna, British Columbia for Standard Distance triathlon.

McNamara raced for Team Canada at the International Triathlon Union World Championships in 2014 and 2015. 

McNamara was the 2015 British Columbia Provincial Sprint Triathlon Champion.

McNamara raced her first triathlon in 2012, placing 14th in her division at the SheRox San Diego Triathlon. She currently trains under coach Clint Lien with the Mercury Rising Triathlon club in Victoria, British Columbia, Canada.

In March 2020, McNamara founded a non-medical mask shop called The Kindness Factory . She currently employed as its CEO  

In February of 2021, The Kindness Factory announced that it would be expanding its offerings to include reusable cloth pads for menstruation and incontinence.

Results

Source: karmenmcnamara.com (Retrieved November 24, 2016)

Advocacy Work 
McNamara is best known for her advocacy work surrounding access to recreation for people with disabilities and mental illness through the Victoria Cool Aid Society and Victoria Special Olympics.

In 2018, she penned an open letter to Victoria City Council in support of access to a barrier-free recreation facility known as Crystal Pool and Fitness Centre. She addressed Council on November 22, 2018, and published a follow-up letter on July 2, 2019.

References 

1983 births
Canadian female triathletes
Living people
Sportspeople from Red Deer, Alberta
Sportspeople from Victoria, British Columbia
21st-century Canadian women